Alexander Campbell (born 7 March 1883) was a Scottish footballer who played in the Football League for Leeds City and Middlesbrough.

References

1883 births
20th-century deaths
Year of death unknown
Scottish footballers
English Football League players
Association football defenders
Clachnacuddin F.C. players
Middlesbrough F.C. players
Leeds City F.C. players